Kalb Ali Kandi (also Romanized as Kalb ʿAlī Kandī and Kalb‘alī Kandī) is a village in Charuymaq-e Shomalesharqi Rural District, in the Central District of Hashtrud County, East Azerbaijan Province, Iran. At the 2006 census, its population was 31, in 7 families.

References 

Towns and villages in Hashtrud County